Jacques Ertaud (18 November 1924 – 18 November 1995) was a French film director and screenwriter. Along with Marcel Ichac, he co-directed the film Stars at Noon, which entered into the 9th Berlin International Film Festival.

Selected filmography
 Stars at Noon (1959)
 The Link and the Chain (1963)
 Sans famille (1981)

References

External links

1924 births
1995 deaths
French film directors
French male screenwriters
20th-century French screenwriters
Mountaineering film directors
Writers from Paris
20th-century French male writers